Tribonyx is a small genus of birds in the rail family, containing two extant species and one recently extinct species. The genus is endemic to Australia and New Zealand. They are sometimes lumped with the moorhens in Gallinula.

Species
The living and recently extinct species are:

References

 
Bird genera
Rallidae
^
Taxa named by Bernard du Bus de Gisignies